urbiscript is a programming language for robotics.  It features syntactic support for concurrency and event-based programming.  It is a prototype-based object-oriented scripting language.  It is dynamic: name resolution is performed during the program execution (late binding); slots (member variables) can be added/removed at runtime, and even prototypes (superclasses) of an object can be changed at runtime.

Memory management is performed by reference counting.

Tightly bound to the Urbi platform it supports seamless integration of C++/Java components.

Syntax and semantics

Inspiration
From the syntactical point of view, urbiscript belongs to the C-family of programming languages.

Its prototype-based object-oriented design was influenced by the Self and the Io programming languages.

It is designed to program, but also interact with robots; as such, it is influenced by Unix shells and other languages that provide a read-eval-print loop style interactive toplevel.  However, contrary to others, there is no prompt for user input but answers from the system are prefixed by a timestamp (in milliseconds) between square brackets:
  1 + 1; sleep(1s); 1 + 2 * 3;

[00005420] 2
[00006420] 7

Sequential statements and control flow
urbiscript statements include (among others):
 The if statement, which conditionally executes a block of code, along with else.
 The traditional for statement, as in C which iterates over an iterable object, capturing each element to a local variable for use by the attached block.
 Another for statement, which iterates over an iterable object, capturing each element to a local variable for use by the attached block.
 The while statement, which executes a block of code as long as its condition is true.
 The try statement, which allows exceptions thrown in its attached code block to be caught and handled by catch clauses.  An optional else clause is run if no exception was thrown.  Clean-up code can be guaranteed to be run in every case when given in a finally-clause.
 The assert statement, used during debugging to check for conditions that ought to apply.  urbiscript also feature assert blocks, which can be used to factor several assert statements.

Actually, contrary to most C-like languages and despite what the syntax suggests, statements "have a value", and therefore are expressions, provided they are embedded in braces:
  var status = { if (closed) "closed" else "open" };
  var pass = { try { foo } catch { false } else { true } };

Concurrent statements and control flow
In urbiscript, some control-flow constructs come in several "flavors": two types of sequential composition, and two types of concurrent composition.  Under the hood, concurrency is implemented using coroutines.

Statement composition
Like in C, the semicolon denotes sequential composition: a;b stands for "run statement a then run statement b.  Other tasks may be run between a and b.  Another statement separator, pipe, denotes "tight sequential composition": no other task can be run between a and b in a|b.

Similarly urbiscript features two means to compose statements concurrently. With a,b, first a is run, and at some point b will be --- possibly while a is still running. This is very similar to the & operator in Unix shells.

Scopes are boundaries for backgrounded jobs, as demonstrated in the following example:
  {
    { sleep(2s); echo(2) },
    { sleep(1s); echo(1) }, 
  };
  echo(3);
[00012451] *** 1
[00013447] *** 2
[00013447] *** 3

Concurrent flavors of sequential constructs
Most looping constructs in urbiscript come in several "flavors", which are based on the four statement separators: ;, |,, and &.

For instance
  // This is actually "for;".
  for (var i : [0, 1, 2])
  {
    echo(i);
    echo(i ** 2);
  };
displays

[00002919] *** 0
[00002921] *** 0
[00002921] *** 1
[00002922] *** 1
[00002922] *** 2
[00002922] *** 4

i.e., the loop bodies are not executed sequentially, while the for& keyword runs the loop bodies concurrently:
  for& (var i : [0, 1, 2])
  {
    echo(i);
    echo(i ** 2);
  };
[00021680] *** 0
[00021680] *** 1
[00021680] *** 2
[00021682] *** 0
[00021682] *** 1
[00021682] *** 4

Event-based programming
Aiming at the development of portable robotic applications, urbiscript relies on specific syntactic constructs to specify reactive behaviors such as "go to the charging dock when the battery is low", "play a friendly sound when a known face is recognized", or "stop when an obstacle is detected".

Explicit event handling
Event handling goes into three steps.  First, define an event
  var e = Event.new;
Second, specify event handlers
  at (e?)
    echo("received event e");
Third, "emit" this event
  e!;
[00014333] *** received event e

Events can have payloads, and event handlers enjoy pattern matching on the payload:
  at (e?(1, var x) if x % 2 == 0)
    echo("received event e(1, %s)" % x);
  e!(1, 1);
[00014336] *** received event e
  e!(1, 2);
[00014336] *** received event e
[00014336] *** received event e(1, 2)

Implicit events
The urbiscript language also allows to monitor expressions:
  at (batteryLevel <= 0.2)
    robot.goToChargingDock;
The following example demonstrates the feature:
  var x = 0;
[00002165] 0
  var y = 0;
[00002166] 0
  var z = 0;
[00002167] 0
  at (x + y == z)
    echo("%s + %s == %s" % [x, y, z]);
[00002168] *** 0 + 0 == 0
  x = 1;
[00002169] 1
  z = 1;
[00002170] 1
[00002170] *** 1 + 0 == 1

See also
 Urbi

References

External links
 
 Docker repository
 urbiscript Tutorial

C programming language family
Dynamically typed programming languages
Free compilers and interpreters
Cross-platform free software
High-level programming languages
Object-oriented programming languages
Programming languages created in 2003
Prototype-based programming languages
Scripting languages
Text-oriented programming languages
Robot programming languages